Joseph Homble (born 26 September 1915, date of death unknown) was a Belgian footballer. He played in one match for the Belgium national football team in 1947.

References

External links
 

1915 births
Year of death missing
Belgian footballers
Belgium international footballers
Place of birth missing
Association football midfielders